The 120 members of the fifteenth Knesset were elected on 17 May 1999. The breakdown by party was as follows:

One Israel: 26
Likud: 19
Shas: 17
Meretz: 10
Yisrael BaAliyah: 6
Shinui: 6
Centre Party: 6
National Religious Party: 5
United Torah Judaism: 5
United Arab List: 5
National Union: 4
Hadash: 3
Yisrael Beiteinu: 4
Balad: 2
One Nation: 2

List of members

Replacements

External links
Knesset members in the Fifteenth Knesset Knesset website

 
15